1000mods is a stoner metal band from Chiliomodi, Greece, formed in 2006. The group consists of Dani G. (vocals and bass), Giannis S. (guitar), Giorgos T. (guitar), and Labros G. (drums). The name of the group is a pun linked to the village in which they were formed, as "a thousand" is pronounced "chillia" in Greek.

History 
1000mods formed in 2006. The band released two EPs, Blank Reality in 2007 and Liquid Sleep in 2009.

In October 2010, they produced their first album Super Van Vacation with Billy Anderson (Sleep, Neurosis). In order to promote their debut album, they played two European tour with 40 shows in 15 countries, including festivals such as Rockwave Festival, Desertfest and Lake on Fire.

The second album Vultures was released on 30 May 2014 by The Lab Records. Two European tours followed with a massive two-month tour on October / November 2014 named "Claws Over Europe" and a tour supporting The Atomic Bitchwax during May 2015.

In September 2016, the band released its third album Repeated Exposure To... via Ouga Booga and the Mighty Oug Recordings. The album was produced and mixed by 1000mods and George Leodis leading up engineering at Wreck It Sound Studios in Corinth, Greece. The album was mastered by Brad Boatright (Sleep, Toxic Holocaust) at Audiosiege Studios, Portland, Oregon. In October 2016 the band embarked on a 27-date European Tour with Monkey3 and Moaning Cities.

Τheir 2017 Repeated and Exposed To... tour features a total of 42 live dates in 15 European countries, participating in leading festivals such as Up in Smoke, Desertfest and Keep it Low.

During February and March 2018, 1000mods visited North America for the first time, including Mexico, Canada and United States, for 29 shows.

Influences 
Their main music influences include bands such as Black Sabbath, Colour Haze, Kyuss and MC5.

Discography

Studio albums 
Super Van Vacation (2011, Kozmik Artifactz)
Vultures (2014, The Lab Records)
Repeated Exposure To... (2016, Ouga Booga and the Mighty Oug Recordings)
Youth of Dissent (2020, Ouga Booga and the Mighty Oug Recordings)

EPs 
The Woodrose Effect EP (2009)
Blank Reality (2007, self-released)
Liquid Sleep (2009, SuiSound Productions/CTS Productions)

Singles 
 Valley of Sand (2012, The Lab Records)
 Pearl (2020, Ouga Booga and the Mighty Oug Recordings)

Splits 
 1000mods vs Wight (2010, Fat & Holy Records)

References

External links 
Official website

Greek psychedelic rock music groups
Greek stoner rock musical groups
Musical groups established in 2006
Greek rock music groups